Events from the year 1906 in the United States.

Incumbents

Federal Government 
 President: Theodore Roosevelt (R-New York)
 Vice President: Charles W. Fairbanks (R-Indiana)
 Chief Justice: Melville Fuller (Illinois)
 Speaker of the House of Representatives: Joseph Gurney Cannon (R-Illinois)
 Congress: 59th

Events

January–March

 January 8 – A landslide in Haverstraw, New York kills 21 people.
 February 26 –  Upton Sinclair publishes The Jungle, a novel depicting the life of a contemporary immigrant family in Chicago working in the meat packing industry.
 March 4 – Native American tribal governments are terminated in Indian Territory, a prerequisite for creating the U.S. state of Oklahoma in 1907.

April–June

 April 5 – The Maryland General Assembly authorises the erection of the Union Soldiers and Sailors Monument in Baltimore.
 April 14 – The first service is held at African Methodist Episcopal Church in Los Angeles by W. J. Seymour, in a series later known as the Azusa Street Revival, an event which launches the Pentecostal movement in Christianity.
 April 18 – The 1906 San Francisco earthquake (estimated magnitude 7.8) on the San Andreas Fault destroys much of San Francisco, California, killing at least 3,000 people, with 225,000–300,000 left homeless, and $350,000,000 in damages.
 May 27 – The first inmates are moved to the Culion leper colony by the American Insular Government of the Philippine Islands.
 June – Josephine Terranova is acquitted by a New York City jury of the murder of abusive relatives.
 June 6 – Durham and Southern Railway operates its first revenue train, Bonsal to Durham, North Carolina.
 June 8 – Theodore Roosevelt signs the Antiquities Act into law, authorizing the President to restrict the use of certain parcels of public land with historical or conservation value.
 June 18 – The Lake County Times (later The Times of Northwest Indiana) begins publication.
 June 25 – Harry K. Thaw shoots architect Stanford White at the roof garden theatre of Madison Square Garden (designed by White) in New York City.
 June 28 – Osage Allotment Act allocates land to members of the Osage Nation in Oklahoma.
 June 29 – Mesa Verde is declared a National Park.
 June 30 – The United States Congress passes the Meat Inspection Act and Pure Food and Drug Act.

July–September

 July 11 – Murder of Grace Brown, a factory worker whose killing causes a nationwide sensation.
 July 14 – Gary, Indiana is founded by the United States Steel Corporation.
 August 23 – Unable to control a rebellion in the newly formed Cuban Republic, President Tomás Estrada Palma requests U.S. intervention.
 September 5 – Bradbury Robinson of St. Louis University throws the first legal forward pass in an American football game.
 September 22 – Atlanta race riot: Race riots in Atlanta, Georgia result in 27 people killed and the Black-owned business district severely damaged.
 September 24 – U.S. President Theodore Roosevelt proclaims Devils Tower, Wyoming as the nation's first National Monument.
 September 26 – The first concert of the Telharmonium, the first music synthesizer, is presented at Telharmonic Hall, Broadway at 39th St., New York City.
 September 30 – The first Gordon Bennett Cup in ballooning is held, starting in Paris. The winning team, piloting the balloon United States, lands in Fylingdales, Yorkshire, England, UK.

October–December
 October 1 – The Madeira School, a private boarding school for girls, opens with 28 students attending classes in two buildings on 19th Street, just off Dupont Circle in downtown Washington, D.C.
 October 11 – The San Francisco public school board sparks a United States diplomatic crisis with Japan, by ordering Japanese students to be taught in racially segregated schools.
October 14 – The Chicago White Sox win their First World Series by defeating their crosstown rival Chicago Cubs 4 games to 2 at South Side Park (III)
 November 9 – U.S. President Theodore Roosevelt leaves for a trip to Panama to inspect the construction progress of the Panama Canal (the first time a sitting President of the United States makes an official trip outside of the United States).
 December 4 – Alpha Phi Alpha, the first inter-collegiate Greek-letter Fraternity established for African Americans, is founded at Cornell University.
 December 8 – The Petrified Forest, Arizona is  designated a National Monument.
 December 10 – U.S. President Theodore Roosevelt is awarded the Nobel Peace Prize for his role in negotiating peace in the Russo-Japanese War (1905).

Undated
 The muffuletta sandwich is invented in New Orleans, Louisiana.

Ongoing
 Progressive Era (1890s–1920s)
 Lochner era (c. 1897–c. 1937)
 Black Patch Tobacco Wars (1904–1909)

Births

January–February
 January 7 
Red Allen, trumpet player (died 1967)
Bobbi Trout, pilot (died 2003)
 January 14 – William Bendix, actor (died 1964)
 January 22 – Robert E. Howard, author (died 1936)
 February 4 – Clyde Tombaugh, astronomer (died 1997)
 February 10
Lon Chaney Jr., actor (died 1973)
Erik Rhodes, actor (died 1990)
 February 17 –  Elizabeth M. Ramsey research physician (died 1993)
 February 20 – John Kenley, theatrical producer (died 2009)
 February 28 – Bugsy Siegel, gangster (died 1947)

March–April
 March 4 – Charles Rudolph Walgreen Jr., businessman (died 2007)
 March 6 – Lou Costello, actor and comedian, half of Abbott & Costello team (died 1959)
 March 20 – Ozzie Nelson, actor and band leader (died 1975)
 March 26 – H. Radclyffe Roberts, entomologist and museum administrator (died 1982)
 April 4 – John Cameron Swayze, journalist (died 1995)
 April 22 – Eddie Albert, actor (died 2005)
 April 24 – William Joyce, fascist propagandist (executed 1946 in the United Kingdom)
 April 25 – William J. Brennan, Supreme Court Justice (died 1997)

May–June
 May 3 – Mary Astor, actress and writer (died 1987)
 May 11
 Jacqueline Cochran, aviator (died 1980)
 Ethel Weed, promoter of women's rights in Japan (died 1975)
 Richard Arvin Overton, American war veteran (WWII) ( died 2018)
 May 12 – Maurice Ewing, geophysicist and oceanographer (died 1974)
 May 19 – Bruce Bennett, athlete and actor (died 2007)
 May 23 – Allan Scott, screenwriter (died 1995)
 May 28 – Phil Regan, actor (died 1996)
 June 3 – Josephine Baker, actress (died 1975 in France)
 June 19 – Earl W. Bascom, rodeo pioneer, artist, inventor (died 1995)
 June 22 – Anne Morrow Lindbergh, author and aviator (died 2001)
 June 26 – Viktor Schreckengost, industrial designer (died 2008)

July–August
 July 1 – Estée Lauder, cosmetics entrepreneur (died 2004)
 July 7 – Satchel Paige, baseball player (died 1982)
 July 18 – S. I. Hayakawa, Canadian-born American academic and politician, U.S. Senator from California from 1977 to 1983 (died 1992)
 August 6 – Vic Dickenson, trombonist (died 1984)
 August 9 – Robert L. Surtees, cinematographer (died 1985)
 August 12 – Tedd Pierce, animator (died 1972)
 August 17 – Hazel Bishop, chemist and inventor of "no-smear" lipstick (died 1998)
 August 19 – Philo Farnsworth, American inventor and television pioneer (died 1971)
 August 27 – Ed Gein, serial killer (died 1984)

September–October
 September 5 – Shimon Agranat, American-born president of the Supreme Court of Israel (died 1992)
 September 17 
 Raymond D. Mindlin, mechanician (died 1987)
 Edgar Wayburn, environmentalist (died 2010)
 September 21 – Henry Beachell, plant breeder (died 2006)
 September 27 – Alma Vessells John, nurse, broadcast personality and civil rights activist (died 1986)
 October 6 – Janet Gaynor, actress (died 1984)
 October 7 – James E. Webb, government administrator (died 1992)
 October 15
 Hiram Fong, businessman and U.S. Senator from Hawaii from 1959 to 1977 (died 2004)
 Alicia Patterson, newspaper editor (died 1963)
 October 23 – Gertrude Ederle, swimmer (died 2003)
 October 27 – Earle Cabell, politician (died 1975)

November–December
 November 1 – Johnny Indrisano, boxer and actor (died 1968)
 November 5 – Fred Lawrence Whipple, astronomer (died 2004)
 November 14 – Louise Brooks, actress (died 1985)
 November 15 – Curtis LeMay, U.S.A.F. general, vice-presidential candidate (died 1990)
 November 18 – George Wald, scientist, Nobel Prize laureate (died 1997)
 December 9 – Grace Hopper, computer scientist and naval officer (died 1992)
 December 11 – Herman Welker, U.S. Senator from Idaho from 1951 to 1957 (died 1957)
 December 27 – Oscar Levant, pianist, composer, author, comedian and actor (died 1972)

Deaths

 January 25
John S. Harris, United States Senator from Louisiana from 1868 till 1871 (born 1825)
Joseph Wheeler, U.S. Army general and politician (born 1836)
 February 9 – Paul Laurence Dunbar, poet and publisher (born 1872)
 February 18 – John B. Stetson, hat manufacturer and inventor of the cowboy hat (born 1830)
 February 27 – Samuel Pierpont Langley, astronomer, physicist and aeronautics pioneer (born 1834)
 March 4 – John Schofield, 28th United States Secretary of War and Commanding General of the United States Army (born 1831)
 March 13 – Susan B. Anthony, civil rights and women's suffrage activist (born 1820)
 April 11
 James Anthony Bailey, circus ringmaster (born 1847)
 Francis Pharcellus Church, editor and publisher (born 1839)
 April 24 – Mary Hunt, temperance activist (born 1830)
 April 25 – John Knowles Paine, composer (born 1839)
 May 12 – Gabriel C. Wharton, civil engineer and Confederate general (born 1824)
 May 14 – Carl Schurz, German-born statesman (born 1829)
 May 15 – John K. Bucklyn, Medal of Honor recipient (born 1834)
 June 17 – Harry Nelson Pillsbury, chess champion (born 1872)
 June 25 – Stanford White, architect (born 1853)
 September 20 – Robert R. Hitt, 13th Assistant Secretary of State (born 1834)
 September 21 – Samuel Arnold, conspirator involved in the plot to kidnap U.S. President Abraham Lincoln in 1865 (born 1834)
 October 6 – Buck Ewing, American baseball player New York Giants and MLB Hall of Famer (born 1859)
 October 9 – Joseph Glidden, inventor of barbed wire (born 1813)
 October 16 – Varina Davis, wife of Jefferson Davis, First Lady of the Confederate States of America (born 1826)
 October 17 – James D. Walker, United States Senator from Arkansas from 1879 till 1885 (born 1830)
 November 4 – John H. Ketcham, politician (born 1832)
 November 23 – Willard Warner, United States Senator from Alabama from 1868 till 1871 (born 1826)
 December 12 – Arthur Brown, United States Senator from Utah from 1896 till 1897 (born 1843)
 December 22 – Richard S. Rust, abolitionist (born 1815)
 December 30 – Thomas M. Bowen, United States Senator from Colorado from 1883 till 1889 (born 1835)
 December 31 – Donelson Caffery, United States Senator from Louisiana from 1892 till 1901 (born 1835)

See also
 List of American films of 1906
 Timeline of United States history (1900–1929)

External links

References

 
1900s in the United States
United States
United States
Years of the 20th century in the United States